American Jewish Conference was an ad hoc organization that first met in Pittsburg in January 1943, and had its first official conference in August that year. The initial meeting included delegates from thirty-two national Jewish organizations. It was called to decide upon the role that the American Jewish community would play in representing Jewish demands after the war and helping to build Jewish Palestine. The result was the creation of the American Jewish Conference, which consisted of sixty-four Jewish groups, including American Jewish Committee; it constituted the most representative gathering of American Jews ever.

At the first meeting, moderate American Zionists including Rabbi Stephen Samuel Wise, were eager to concentrate on supporting Zionism through philanthropy and play down the "maximalist" goal of a “Jewish commonwealth.” Rabbi Abba Hillel Silver, representing the maximalists, called for the delegates to endorse the Biltmore Program. Silver's followers characterized the contrast between the two as "Aggressive Zionism" versus "the Politics of the Green Light [from the White House]." He also attacked Wise's views, which upset the delegates from the American Jewish Committee, and caused them to walk out. The conference proceeded and sided with Silver and he emerged from the meeting as the new leader of American Zionism. Silver called for "loud diplomacy." Edward Tivnan writes, "The American Jewish community now had a full-fledged 'Jewish lobby.' In 1943, Silver cranked up the Zionist Organization of America's one-man lobbying operation in Washington --- renaming it the American Zionist Emergency Council (AZEC) --- and began to mobilize American Jewry into a mass movement."

In December 1943, the American Jewish Conference launched a public attack against Hillel Kook and the “Bergson Group” in an attempt to reduce support for the Irgun and Revisionist Zionism in the US and their agenda to more actively rescue European Jews. Following the victory of World War II Abraham Cronbach wrote letters to American Jewish Conference and other Jewish organizations asking that they not seek punishment of Nazi war criminals.

Philip Morris Klutznick, the newly elected president of B’nai B’rith in the early 1950s, remembers the difficulties of getting any consensus in the "majority rule” American Jewish Conference.

The American Jewish Conference ended its activities in 1949.

Notes

References
 

Jewish-American political organizations
Jewish organizations established in 1943
Zionist organizations
Zionism in the United States